Angel in a Taxi is a 1958 Italian film. It stars Gabriele Ferzetti and Vera Tschechowa.

Cast
 Vera Tschechowa: Camilla, the dancer
 : Marietto
 Vittorio De Sica: God
 Gabriele Ferzetti: Andrea
 Guido Lauri: the dance partner
 Roberto Risso: Filippo
 Pina Renzi: Nun
 Gisella Sofio: Celeste, the nun
 Mario Carotenuto: Stepfather
 Dori Dorika: Stepmother
 Amalia Pellegrini:the baker's mother
 Erminio Spalla:the saltimbanco
 Dolores Palumbo: Giuseppa
 Giacomo Furia: Bakery's owner
 Ferdinand Guillaume:the garbage collector
 Spartaco Bandini: the owner of the
 Giusi Raspani Dandolo: car accident lady
 Pina Gallini:mother rejected by Marietto
 Rita Rosa: the pastry shop order
 Furio Meniconi:a taxinar
 Mimmo Poli:spectator at the performance of the acrobats

References

External links

1958 films
Italian fantasy comedy films
1950s Italian-language films
Films about ballet
Films set in Rome
1950s Italian films